The 1938 South Carolina gubernatorial election was held on November 8, 1938 to select the governor of the state of South Carolina. Burnet Rhett Maybank, Mayor of Charleston, South Carolina, won the contested Democratic primary and defeated Republican Joseph Augustis Tolbert in the general election becoming the 99th governor of South Carolina.

Democratic primary
The South Carolina Democratic Party held their primary for governor on August 30 and it is noted as being the last attempt by former Governor Cole Blease at becoming governor again. Maybank, the mayor of Charleston, had the support of the Lowcountry and emerged victorious from the runoff on September 13  against Wyndham Manning because the Upstate failed to coalesce around his candidacy.

General election
The general election was held on November 8, 1938 and Burnet Rhett Maybank was elected the next governor of South Carolina against token Republican candidate Joseph Augustis Tolbert. Being a non-presidential election and few contested races, turnout was much lower than the Democratic primary election. The presence of even a token opposition candidate was unusual for South Carolina at the time.

 
 

|-
| 
| colspan=5 |Democratic hold
|-

See also
Governor of South Carolina
List of governors of South Carolina
South Carolina gubernatorial elections

References

"Supplemental Report of the Secretary of State to the General Assembly of South Carolina." Report of the State Officers Boards and Committees to the General Assembly of the State of South Carolina. Volume I. Columbia, South Carolina: 1939, pp. 30–31.

External links
SCIway Biography of Burnet Rhett Maybank

1938 United States gubernatorial elections
1938
Gubernatorial
November 1938 events